Henri Delhoste, (Perpignan, 22 July 1931 – 25 December 2013) was a French Rugby league footballer. He played as prop.

He played for XIII Catalan for all of his career, and with said team he won the French Championship in 1957 and the Lord Derby Cup in 1959. Thanks to his club performances, he earned 5 caps for France between 1957 and 1960 and took part at the 1957 Rugby League World Cup.

Biography 
He was called up for the France national team for the 1957 Rugby League World Cup alongside his teammates Robert Médus and Francis Lévy.

Honours

Rugby league 

 Team honours :
 Winner of the French Championship in 1957 (XIII Catalan).
 Winner of the Lord Derby Cup in 1959 (XIII Catalan).
 Runner-up at the Lord Derby Cup in 1952, 1954 and 1957 (XIII Catalan).

References

External links 
 Henri Delhoste profile at rugbyleagueproject.com

French rugby league players
1931 births
2013 deaths
Rugby league props
France national rugby league team players
XIII Catalan players
Sportspeople from Perpignan